Leiodini is a tribe of round fungus beetles in the family Leiodidae. There are over 400 described species in Leiodini.

Genera
These 19 genera belong to the tribe Leiodini:

 Afrocyrtusa Daffner, 1990
 Afroleiodes Peck, 2003
 Anogdus LeConte, 1866
 Chobautiella Reitter, 1900
 Cyrtusa Erichson, 1842
 Cyrtusamorpha Daffner, 1983
 Cyrtusoma Daffner, 1982
 Ecarinosphaerula Hatch, 1929
 Hypoliodes Portevin, 1908
 Incacyrtusa Daffner, 1990
 Isoplastus Horn, 1880
 Leiodes Latreille, 1797
 Liocyrtusa Daffner, 1982
 Lionothus W.J.Brown, 1937
 Ovocyrtusa Daffner, 1985
 Parvocyrtusa Peck & Cook, 2014
 Pseudolionothus Peck & Cook, 2014
 Xanthosphaera Fairmaire, 1859
 Zeadolopus Broun, 1903

References

Leiodidae